Hisar Airport , officially known as Maharaja Agrasen International Airport existing as domestic airport presently under upgrade by 30 March 2024,  is a DGCA-licensed public airport serving Hisar in Haryana state of India. Hisar is a National Capital Region Counter Magnet City (NCR CMC) on the 'Hisar-Narnaul Industrial Sub-corridor' of Delhi Mumbai Industrial Corridor Project.

The airport is under expansion and upgrade to an international airport, MRO, aerospace  university, aerospace and defence manufacturing industrial zone, logistics and food parks, etc. spread across . In 2021, the total cost of planned upgrade in 3 phases, including the actual spend and future approved allocations, is nearly INR5,200 crore or US$700 million.

Background

Location

Hisar is a Counter Magnet City within the National Capital Region inside the Delhi Mumbai Industrial Corridor Project (DMIC). The main gate of the airport will be relocated to Hisar–Barwala–Chandigarh NH 52.

Hisar Airport lies in the north of Hisar city. Nearest airports are Sirsa Air Force Station 84 km or 45 nautical miles northwest, Bhiwani Airport 56 km or 30 nautical miles southeast, IGI Delhi International Airport 152 km or 82.1 nautical miles southeast, and Chandigarh International Airport 193 km or 104 NM northeast. Nearest railway station is Hisar Junction railway station 2.9 km south, nearest defence area is Hisar Military Station 7 km east, nearest university is GJUST 50 metre across the highway in south, nearest protected forests are Hisar Deer Park and Shatavar Vatika Herbal Park both abutting the airport.

History

In 1948, first airstrip was built in Haryana when Ambala Air Force Station was established.

In 1965, construction of  Hisar airfield commenced, which was completed in 1967 and it became operational in the same year.

In 1970–71, a privately managed air service was introduced on Delhi–Patiala–Hisar–Delhi route, which was terminated after a period of 6 months due to lack of financial viability.

In 1999, Hisar Aviation Club was merged with Haryana Institute of Civil Aviation (HICA). The airport is managed by HICA, which provides flight training using light aircraft. In 2002, the Delhi Flying Club (DFC) shifted all its flying activities and aircraft to Hisar from Safdarjung Airport in Delhi.

In May 2017, the Taj International Airport, at Jewar ( from Noida) in Gautam Budh Nagar district of Uttar Pradesh, was granted approval by the union government cabinet as the second airport for the NCR, to be built by 2022–23 with a capacity to handle 30-50 million passengers per year. Politicians of Haryana protested against this decision for ignoring Hisar airport for the development.

On 27 Sept 2018, Hisar became Haryana's first DGCA licensed airport.

In September 2019, SpiceJet  training academy at Hisar airport was announced, which will train 100 pilots every year.

On 26 July 2021, Chief Minister of Haryana, Manohar Lal Khattar, announced that the airport will be named after the Maharaja Agrasen. It has been renamed as the Maharaja Agrasen International Airport. This will boost tourism to religious and archaeological sites of Agroha Dham and Agroha Mound respectively.

Airport features

The features of airport after the upgrade including runway extension are as follows:

 Runway
 Runways count: 1 existing and 1 future.
 Runway-1 existing: will have a passenger terminal-1 building in its north with TERI's GRIHA green building certification. As of 2021, there are HICA facilities and small airport building to runway's south.
 Runway-2 future: Runway-2 will be parallel and north of runway-1. Runway-2  will have a passenger terminal-2 building in its south. Passenger buildings of runway 1 and 2 will face each other with a common access road in the middle. Under the access road will be an underground high-speed train station connected to both passenger terminal 1 and 2 via underground tunnel which will also connect to the bus station.
 Terminal
 Terminal-1 for runway-1: 30,000 sqm passenger terminal with 60,000 sqm ancillary building, 40,000 sqm roads, 40,000 sqm green areas, commercial area within the terminal such as food outlets and shopping, taxi services etc.
 Terminal-2 for runway-2: to be decided.
 Runway Dimension: 3000m x 60m
 Runway strip dimension: 3120m x 280m optical landing system (OLS) area
 Runway orientation: 12/30
 Runway aircraft suitability: ICAO Code-C aircraft (mid range aircraft)
 Air navigation equipment
 Navigational signal: DVOR, compass rose and wind rose
 Instrument Landing System (ILS): CAT III night landing facilities with <30 m (100 ft) decision height and > 200 m (700 ft) runway visual range (RVR)
 ATC to be built 
 Runway edge lights (REL): Yes
 Approach Lighting System (ALS): Yes
 Airport operations
 Aircraft operations type: both scheduled and non-scheduled
 Aircraft operations flight volume: estimated 20 flights per day 
 Passengers Per Year (PPY): estimated 3 million PAX
 Passengers Peak Hour (PPH): 500 PAX
 Employment: 1000 direct and 5000 indirect
 Other
 Aerodrome Reference Code (ARC): 3C
 Development phases: I, II, and III (A, B, C)
 Total Land Area (TLA): over 10,000 acres

Phased development

Land for airport

The airport is being developed on more than  land. The  Beed Hisar land contiguous to the existing airstrip was transferred to the airport in June 2017. Additional  contiguous land of Government Livestock Farm in the Talwandi Rana village, next to Lala Lajpat Rai University of Veterinary and Animal Sciences, was also transferred to the airport for developing the commercial, industrial and hospitality zone of integrated aerocity. This 3000 acre land around Talwandi Rana Minor Canal lies between Hisar–Barwala–Chandigarh NH–52, Delhi–Hisar–Sirsa NH–9 and Hisar Northern bypass.

Three phases 

The Government of Haryana, had initially forwarded a proposal to the Central government as a greenfield international airport project. However, since such proposals required approvals like site clearance, the proposal was withdrawn. Instead, a proposal for upgrading the existing  brownfield (existing) airport was forwarded to the centre. In 2016, Frost and Sullivan completed a feasibility study for the development of an integrated aviation hub including an international airport in 3 phases.

Finances

Phase-wise funding 

 Phase-I: , from 2016–17 to 2018–19 cumulative total spend by Haryana government.
 Phase-II: 
 Phase-III
 Phase-III-A - International airport: 
 Phase-III-B - Integrated hub: 
 Phase-III-C - Integrated hub:

Chronology of funding 

 2020–21 financial year 
 , in 2020–21 by the central government, through AAI, for upgrade to the interim civil aviation operations including new terminal building, hangars, strengthening of the runway, installation of night-flying equipment, ATC, and security equipment.
 , in 2020–21 haryana budget allocation for runway expansion, apron and 23 meter wide taxiway.
  2021-22 till 2023-24 3-year total allocation was approved by the Haryana govt in 2021 for the basic infrastructure upgrade to phase-III international airport.

Phase-I: UDAN domestic airport – completed

The airport was upgraded for domestic flights under the government's  UDAN scheme with technical collaboration with AAI, which was completed by December 2018, The upgrade included new terminal building, 3 hangars, strengthening of runway, installation of night flying equipments, perimeter flood lights, security equipments and arrangements, widening of approach road to four lanes, etc., with a cumulative total of more than  allocation from the Haryana government during the 2016–17, 2017–18 and 2018–19 state budgets.

Phase-I is complete after environment clearance was obtained, and domestic flights started for Chandigarh, Dhramshala, Jammu and Dehradun.

Phase-II: MRO & cargo h7b hub and runway extension - completion by March 2023 

Phase-II entails development of passenger and cargo terminal buildings, runway, taxiways and aprons system, airfield lighting system, air traffic control (ATC) tower, airport support facilities, domestic cargo building, staff accommodation, fire station, building for security staff, maintenance building, aircraft parking, public parking, utilities and infrastructure including roads, 32 kv electrical substation and power supply system, and aircraft support facilities such as refuelling, repairs and overhaul, ground support, and catering etc. at an investment of Rs 9.46 billion and will handle 3.5 million passengers per annum (mppa). A 12,000 sqm  car park opposite terminal building for 250 Cars.

Status as of July 2021 is as follows:

Note: Revised deadline for completion of the following work related to MRO & Cargo Hub, airstrip ectension, boundary wall, taxi ways and bays, night and fog landing runway lights, etc. is March 2023, and upgraded airport will become operational 8 March 2023 (as per Aug-Sept 2022 updates by govt).

 construction/extension of runway and apron from 1,200 m (4,000 ft) to 3,000 m (10,000 ft) wa underway in 3 places due to 2 road highways cutting through the airport, it will be completed by May 2022. INR160 cr work was in progress, of which digging and sand filling work was 90% complete. 
 CAT III night landing facilities
 ATC to be built 
 Hangars
 Fixed base operation (FBO)
 Small scale MRO hub.
 Defence manufacturing and defence MRO
 Domestic cargo infra
 Raipur rail sliding for cargo and passengers

Phase-III: International airport aerocity and industrial hub - completion by 2030

Three sub-phases - completion by 2024, 2027, 2030 

Starting from fy 2021–22, this phase will be completed in three sub-phases with the planned initial investment for each phase as follows:

 Phase-III-A - International airport, INR 572 cr, 2yrs, 31 March 2024: Fund of INR 572 cr has been allocated which entails upgrade required for the international airport operation such as runway extension and allied facilities, Differential GPS and night landing facilities, etc. to be completed in 2 years by 31 March 2024 (end of fy 2023–24).
 Phase-III-B - integrated hub, INR 1390 cr, 2-5 yr, 31 March 2024-27: Fund of INR 1390 cr has been allocated which entails upgrade for aero city, logistics hub and connectivity, etc. Starting from fy 2021-22 it will be completed in 2 to 5 years ending some time between 31 March 2024 to 27 31 March 2024.
 Phase-III-C - Integrated hub, INR 1811 cr, 6-10 yrs, 31 March 2028-30: Fund of INR 1811 cr has been allocated which entails upgrade required for the expansion of commercial, industrial and residential activities. Starting from fy 2021-22 it will be completed in 6 to 10 years ending some time between 31 March 2028 to 31 March 2030.

Phase-III-A: International airport - completion by 31 March 2024 

On 28 Feb 2018, Civil Aviation minister announced that Hisar will become India's largest international airport, feasibility report of which was already complete, AAI had submitted the proposal for upgrade work to the Ministry of Civil Aviation. Based on AAI's DPR (detailed project report), tenders were issued in 2019 for developing the phase-III International Aviation Hub scope of which also includes runway extension. Airport will also have the Aerospace Manufacturing, Aviation Training Centre and Aviation University, International Airport and Commercial and Residential Aerotropolis as separate projects and DPRs.

Status as of July 2021 is as follows:
 Phase-III - was planning and DPR was done by AAI through TCS
 International airport 
 Aerospace manufacturing  
 Aviation training centre and university
 Airport commercial and residential zone construction
 Bulk drug park
 Medicity on 500 acre
 Separate but integrated specialised hubs and buildings for the tourism, agriculture, animal husbandry, aircraft industry, big pharma companies, radar, film city.

Phase-III-B & C : International airport - completion by 31 March 2027 and 31 March 2030 

Starting from fy 2021–22, this phase will take 2 to 5 years to complete by 31 May 2024 to 31 May 2027

Aerospace and Defence Technology University - completion by TBD 

There already are government and commercial flight training institutes, and an aerospace university will also be opened.

 Government flight training institute: Haryana Institute of Civil Aviation (HICA), run by Haryana govt, has been already operating at Hisar for several decades. As of 2018, it had one four-seater Cessna-172 R and one two-seater Cessna 152 FA aircraft, 2 hangars (85 ft x 72 ft and 96 ft x 70 ft) dedicated to HICA aircraft, 530 sqm administration block, VIP Lounge, 170 sqm hostel for aviation and security staff, one 65 sqm dormitory for aviation and security staff, control tower, 400 sqm training complex with one classroom and one library.
 Commercial flight training institute: In 2019, SpiceJet announced that they will establish a flight training academy at Hisar airport with 10 training aircraft which will train and produce 100 new Commercial Pilot Licence holders (CPL) every year. 10% students, including 4% girls, with Haryana domicile will get 50% waiver on the tuition fee. SpiceJet will place 70% of the 100 pilot trainees within its own organisation.
 Hisar Aerospace and Defence Manufacturing University will be established at the airport zone.

Integrated commercial and industrial hub 

The industrial hub will be integrated with the aerocity and it will be undertaken as one integrated project which will have several sub-projects in Phase-II, such as aerocity, logistics park, food park, defence and aerospace manufacturing hub, etc. Following have been approved or proposed. Haryana government was actively pursuing with the private and public sector companies to set up their base in the Hisar integrated aviation industrial park.

Aerocity Airport commercial and residential zone  

Hisar Aerocity is the planned airport commercial and residential zone which includes range of hotels, office space, malls, retail, trading, wide range of commercial and professional services including third party cargo and passenger services, etc. This will be located to the west and southwest of the runway-1.

Manufacturing hub

Aerospace and defence manufacturing - completion by TBD 

In October 2019, the discussions for the manufacturing plant for special alloy commenced between the Chief Minister of Haryana, Manohar Lal Khattar and India's Minister of Defence.

Food Park at Hisar (FPH) - completion by TBD 

Mega Food Parks are approved by the Union Ministry of Food Processing Industries (MOFPI) which provides grants up to Rs 50 crores for each food park to a consortium of companies. Two mega food parks for Haryana, at Sonipat and Rohtak, have been approved by MOFPI. Haryana government is in the process of planning and preparing DPR for food park at Hisar.

Bulk drug manufacturing park - completion by TBD

MRO hub - completion by TBD 

In 2018, an MoU was signed with Spice Jet for development of MRO hub at Hisar. In October 2019, Haryana govt has made offers to Hindustan Aeronautics Limited (HAL), Indian Air Force IAF) and Indian Army (IA) to commence MRO at Hisar for their helicopters and planes.

Multi-Modal Logistics Parks (MMLP Hisar) - completion by TBD 

Hisar airport will also be developed as cargo airport, dry port with double-rack railway sliding, as well as multi-model transport hub with space of large trucks. DPR for double-tracks of broad gauge rail from Raipur railway halt to airport dry port area was ready in August 2021 and it will be constructed as part of Phase-III. MoRTH has approved a Multi-Modal Logistics Parks (MMLP) for Hisar, DPR and subsequent tender are under preparation as of July 2021.

MMLP is a government of India initiative to lower the logistics cost and time, enhance value add and boost economy. As of July 2021, MoRTH has planned to develop 35 MMLPs under Public-Private Partnership (PPP) in Design, Build, Finance, Operate and Transfer (DBFOT) mode. Based on the detailed project report (DPR), feasibility study and approved bidding document, the tender will be invited from companies. The bidding documents (The Model Concession Agreement and Request for Proposal) is being finalised for these 35 MMLPs, each of which will have a minimum area of 100 acres (40.5 hectares), with various modes of transport access, and comprising mechanized warehouses, specialized storage solutions such as cold storage, facilities for mechanized material handling and inter-modal transfer container terminals, and bulk and break-bulk cargo terminals. Logistics parks will further provide value-added services such as customs clearance with bonded storage yards, quarantine zones, testing facilities, and warehousing management services. Provisions will also be made for late-stage manufacturing activities such as kitting and final assembly, grading, sorting, labelling and packaging activities, re-working, and returns management.

Multi-model transport hub and surface connectivity

Bus station and multi-model last-mile connectivity 

Plans are under way to relocate Hisar Bus station to the land immediate east of airport to create an integrated rail-bus-aero transport hub, which will also have a logistics park, last mile connectivity via taxis, car park, etc.

Roads

Expressways and highways 

Airport lies on Delhi bypass in Hisar city on NH 9 Abohar-Delhi route, which was upgraded by 2020 to six-lane barrier-free access-controlled expressway to enhance its connectivity with Delhi. The NH 52 Chandigarh–Rajgarh–Jaipur, which also passes next to the airport, was also upgraded to six-lanes by 2020. There are plan to

 NH-9: will be expanded to 8-lanes with increase in the traffic due to aerocity, cargo airport and logistics hub, etc.
 Hisar-Narnaul-Alwar-Mathura/Gwalior Expressway: Upgrade route to National Highway with additional lanes, via Hisar-Mangali-Shahrwa-Kairu-south of Jui, north of Badhra - Akoda (spur from upgrade Akoda to Rewari Sh to NH) - existing NH (Mahendragarh-Narnaul to NH148B-NH48 junction) - Harsora - Badli (with spur Badli-Khairthal-Kishangarh- then underground tunnels between Damookar-Thons and Sarpur-Ferozepur Jhirka) - upgrade existing SH-14 to Mathura (Badli-Alwar-Deeg-Mathura), upgrade existing SH-45 to NH (Feroepur Jhirka-Nadbai), greenfield Nadbai-Uchain-Jindpura), upgrade SH23 to NH (Nagla/Bharatpur-Jindpura-Dholpur), greenfield Nadbai-DarhraMod-Beerampura-Kakraua, upgrade SH43to NH (Bharatpur-Kakrua-Ranpur/Dhaulpur), greenfield Ranpur-Rahe-Jaura bridge over Chambal river and to Gwalior NCR CMC.

Other roads 

NH-52 Hisar north bypass at Talwandi Rana, via Dhansu-Mirzapur, to NH-9 Hisar bypass near Geeta Colony east of GJUST widening and strengthening of road to provide alternative connectivity was already completed by 2021.

Railway 

In phase-II the railway services at Raipur will be upgraded for the passenger services and cargo handling including sliding. Additionally, Hisar-Delhi semi-highspeed train will be run once the construction of Hisar-Hansi link is completed. In phase-III, an underground integrated railway station will be constructed at the airport and  semi-highspeed train will be extended to airport via Hisar Junction railway station. DPR for double-tracks of broad gauge rail from Raipur railway halt to airport dry port area was ready in August 2021 and it will be constructed as part of Phase-III.

Hisar Airport rail line will be a new greenfield short extension from the existing Hisar–Jakhal line to Airport integrated transport hub. DPR will be ready soon (dec 2018 update). Airport will have an underground railway station, and Indian Railways has agreed to commence the construction with the commencement of phase-III of airport.

Once the under construction Hisar-Hansi line is completed, 200 km/hour semi-high speed Hisar-Hansi-Rohtak-Bahadurgarh-IGI Delhi will be operated which will run at an average speed of 160 km/hr and will travel the distance between Hisar Airport to IGI Delhi in one and half hours, and an underground railway station will be constructed at the Hisar airport for the integrated transport hub. This may require upgrade/replacement of existing or laying of additional new line between Hansi to Asaudha (near Bahadurgarh on Haryana Orbital Rail Corridor). This will also connect to the Delhi–Alwar Regional Rapid Transit System near Gurugram via Haryana Orbital Rail corridor.

Present status

Summary status update on development 

 July 2021: Phase-I completed, Phase-II under-construction, and for the Phase-III plan was being prepared by the Tata Consultancy Services (TCS). The 7200 acre airport will have 3300 m runway, and in third phase a second runway will be constructed parallel to the existing runway, it will have air cargo as well as scheduled domestic and international passenger flights which will have separate terminals with parking space for 50 aircraft, with night landing facility, and it will be connected to the high speed rail to IGI Delhi Airport which was approved in 2019 and it will be enabled after completion of Hisar-Hansi rail line and the railway station will be underground for the seamless connectivity. Spice Jet has signed an agreement to set up flight training centre to train pilots in the batches of 100 pilots. Also see individual phases above for detailed status.
 Sept 2022: Phase-I was complete, Phase-II construction was underway which is on target to be completed by March 2023.

Scheduled domestic flights 

There are approved scheduled domestic flights for Chandigarh Airport, Dharamshala Kangra Airport, Jammu Airport and Dehradun Jolly Grant Airport. On 13 January 2021, Hisar officially became 54th UDAN airport when the first ever Hisar-Chandigarh flight took wings under the UDAN scheme. The flight is operated by the "Aviation Connectivity & Infrastructure Developers Pvt. Ltd" under the brand name the "Air Taxi"' - India's first startup airline - which has been awarded the Hisar-Chandigarh-Hisar route under the UDAN scheme. One way fare is INR 1674. Air Taxi India flies Tecnam P2006T on Hisar-Chandigarh route daily as of 1st Feb 2021, which also undertakes on-demand flights. The flight operations have been temporarily disrupted in India and elsewhere while the nations struggle with bringing covid pandemic under control.

Plans are on to commence flights to other places, especially other NCR CMC and state capitals and/or industrial hubs, including to Jaipur International Airport, Amristsar Airport, Ludhiana Airport, Narnaul Airport, Jewar Airport, Bareilly Airport (Jat Regiment and access to Uttrakhand and Kailash-Mansarovar), Agra Airport, Gwalior Airport, Bhopal Raja Bhoj Airport.

See also

 List of airports in India
 Airports Authority of India
 List of busiest airports in India
 List of Indian Air Force bases
 List of highways in Haryana
 Railway in Haryana

References

Hisar (city)
Airports in Haryana
International airports in India
Flying clubs
Transport in Hisar (city)
Airports established in 1965
1965 establishments in East Punjab
20th-century architecture in India